The 2011–12 Kent Invicta Football League season was the first in the history of the Kent Invicta Football League, a football competition in England.

League table

The inaugural season of the league featured the following 14 clubs from the Kent County League and two new clubs.
Clubs joined from Kent County League Premier Division:
Bearsted
Bly Spartans
Bridon Ropes
Hollands & Blair
Lewisham Borough
Phoenix Sports
Rusthall
Sutton Athletic
Woodstock Park
Clubs joined from Kent County League Division One West:
Crockenhill
Orpington
Club joined from Kent County League Division Two East:
Lydd Town
Clubs joined from Kent County League Division Two West:
Meridian S & S
Seven Acre & Sidcup, who also changed their name from Seven Acre Sports
Plus:
Ashford United, new club formed after Ashford Town (Kent) folded in 2010.
Erith & Dartford Town, joined from the South London Football Alliance

League table

Results

External links
 Kent Invicta Football League

Kent Invicta Football League seasons
10